Col. Hiram M. Hiller House is a historic home located at Kahoka, Clark County, Missouri. It was built in 1874, and is a two-story, vernacular Italianate style frame dwelling.  It has a rear ell and wraparound porch with a truncated hipped roof.

It was listed on the National Register of Historic Places in 1986.

References

Houses on the National Register of Historic Places in Missouri
Italianate architecture in Missouri
Houses completed in 1874
Buildings and structures in Clark County, Missouri
National Register of Historic Places in Clark County, Missouri
1874 establishments in Missouri